Motorola C139 is a cellular phone designed and manufactured for Motorola by an Original design manufacturer. It addresses people with basic needs, and has limited features. This phone has been offered on AT&T's GoPhone service, TracFone, Cellular One, and Net10. It is primarily focused for prepaid plans, and was claimed by a PC Magazine review to be the cheapest unlocked GSM handset. The Motorola C139 is supported by OsmocomBB.

Design flaws 

This phone is designed so that the LCD screen is only readable with the backlight on.

References

External links

  Motorola's C139 Support Page
  Motorola C139 Manual

C139
Mobile phones introduced in 2005